The 2022 Gent–Wevelgem in Flanders Fields was a road cycling one-day race that took place on 27 March 2022 in the provinces of West Flanders and Hainaut in west Belgium. It was the 84th edition of Gent–Wevelgem and the 10th event of the 2022 UCI World Tour.

From the start, the race course headed east towards Kortrijk before heading back towards Ypres, after which it headed as far north as Veurne. There were no climbs in the first  of the race, but from Veurne, the race course turned south and roughly followed the Belgium–France border until it reached a series of seven cobblestone sections and nine short hills to the south of Ypres. Following the first cobblestone section, four hills were crested in quick succession, followed by several more cobblestone sections, and then the other five hills. The last hill, and the third ascent of the Kemmelberg, crested with  left.

After many attacks across the race's cobblestone sections and short hills, two groups merged to form a reduced peloton with around  left. Shortly thereafter, four riders attacked from the reduced peloton to form the winning breakaway: Biniam Girmay, Christophe Laporte, Jasper Stuyven, and Dries Van Gestel. As the quartet rode down the finishing straight into a headwind, Girmay was the first to begin sprinting, coming from the back of the group, and held off the others for the victory. In doing so, he became the first African winner of a classic cycle race. Søren Kragh Andersen, who had attacked from the peloton in the final  in an attempt to bridge across to the lead group, stayed ahead of the peloton to finish fifth, while Tim Merlier won the reduced bunch sprint for sixth.

Teams 
All 18 UCI WorldTeams and seven UCI ProTeams made up the 25 teams that participated in the race. Of the invited teams, with six riders, was the only one to not enter a full squad of seven riders. They were reduced further to five riders with one non-starter;  also had a non-starter and were reduced to six riders. In total, 172 riders started the race, of which 106 finished.

UCI WorldTeams

 
 
 
 
 
 
 
 
 
 
 
 
 
 
 
 
 
 

UCI ProTeams

Result

References

External links 
 

2022 UCI World Tour
2022 in Belgian sport
2022
March 2022 sports events in Belgium